NCW may refer to:
 National Commission for Women, an Indian government organization
 Neocatechumenal Way, a group within the Catholic Church
 Newcastlewest, a town in County Limerick, Ireland
 New College Worcester, England, for visually-impaired students
 Network Centric Warfare, using information technology for battlefield advantage
 Northern Championship Wrestling, professional wrestling promotion in Quebec
 NCW Femmes Fatales, women's professional wrestling promotion in Quebec
 National Chemistry Week, an annual celebration of chemistry in the United States